Libertiella is a genus of fungi belonging to the family Pilocarpaceae.

The species of this genus are found in Europe.

The genus name of Libertiella is in honour of Marie-Anne Libert, (1782-1865), who was a Belgian botanist and mycologist.

The genus was circumscribed by Carlos Luis Spegazzini and Casimir Roumeguère in Rev. Mycol. (Toulouse) vol.2 on pages 8-9, 14-15 and 97 in 1880.

Species:
 Libertiella fennica 
 Libertiella leprariae 
 Libertiella malmedyensis 
 Libertiella xanthoriae

References

Fungi